The 2016 SEC Championship Game was played on Saturday, December 3, 2016 in the Georgia Dome in Atlanta, Georgia, and determined the 2016 football champion of the Southeastern Conference (SEC). The game was played between the Eastern Division champion, Gators, and Western Division champion Alabama. The Eastern Division team was the designated home team, and the game was broadcast nationally by CBS for the 16th consecutive year. This was the final SEC Championship Game in the Georgia Dome, which was demolished on November 20, 2017 after its successor, Mercedes-Benz Stadium, opened on August 26 of the same year. The title game moved to the new stadium and will remain there through at least 2027.

Alabama earned a berth in the SEC Championship on November 12 after clinching the SEC West.

2015 season
In the 2015 SEC Championship Game, Alabama defeated Florida 29–15. Alabama went on to defeat Michigan State 38–0 in the Cotton Bowl, which served as a College Football Playoff semifinal, and defeated Clemson 45–40 in the national championship game.

Verne Lundquist retiring
This would be Verne Lundquist's final SEC Championship Game broadcast. He retired from calling college football following the Army-Navy Game. He was succeeded by Brad Nessler.

Teams

Florida

Alabama

Game summary

Source:

Statistics

See also
 Alabama–Florida football rivalry

References

Championship Game
SEC Championship Game
Alabama Crimson Tide football games
Florida Gators football games
December 2016 sports events in the United States
2016 in sports in Georgia (U.S. state)
2016 in Atlanta